Cahoots and similar may refer to:
 Cahoots (album), the fourth LP by Canadian-American rock group The Band
CAHOOTS (crisis response), a program that answers mental-health related 911 calls in Eugene, Oregon
 Cahoots (film), a 2001 movie directed by Dirk Benedict and starring David Keith
 A Magical Monster from the game My Singing Monsters.

See also
 Cahoot, an internet bank in the United Kingdom
 In Cahoots, a Canterbury scene band let by guitarist Phil Miller
 Kahoot! is a game-based learning platform, used as educational technology in schools and other educational institutions
 Kahoots (plural), user-generated multiple-choice quizzes used by Kahoot!